This article refers to crime in the U.S. state of Delaware.

Statistics
In 2008, there were 37,444 crimes reported in Delaware, including 57 murders, 31,303 property crimes, and 366 rapes.

Capital punishment laws

Capital punishment is not applied in this state.

References